Marc Weber may refer to:

 Marc Weber (ice hockey) (born 1973), Swiss professional ice hockey centre
 Marc Weber (rower, born 1972), German rower
 Marc Weber (rower, born 1997), German rower

See also 
 Mark Webber (disambiguation)